Hypsioma constellata is a species of beetle in the family Cerambycidae. It was described by James Thomson in 1868. It is known from Brazil and French Guiana.

References

charila
Beetles described in 1868